Crypsis is a genus of African and Eurasian plants in the grass family, sometimes referred to as pricklegrass. These are annual grasses with short leaves. A few species are invasive weeds outside their native ranges.

Taxonomy

Accepted species 
The following species belong in the genus Crypsis, according to contemporary taxonomic treatments:

 Crypsis aculeata – from Portugal and Mauritania to Korea
 Crypsis acuminata – from Turkey to Kazakhstan
 Crypsis alopecuroides – from Portugal and Morocco to Korea; introduced in western North America (British Columbia + western USA)
 Crypsis factorovskyi – Caucasus, Turkey, Cyprus, Syria, Lebanon, Palestine, Jordan
 Crypsis hadjikyriakou – Cyprus
 Crypsis minuartioides – Sharon Plain in northwestern Israel
 Crypsis schoenoides – from Britain to China + Pakistan + Mozambique; introduced in North America (western USA, Great Lakes region, Baja California)
 Crypsis turkestanica – Central Asia, Caucasus, western Siberia, southern European Russia
 Crypsis vaginiflora – Africa; Middle East, India, Pakistan; introduced in North America (Idaho, Oregon, California, Baja California)

Former species 
The following species were formerly included in the genus Crypsis, but have since been combined into other genera (Muhlenbergia, Munroa, Phleum, Rhizocephalus, Sporobolus, Urochondra):

 Crypsis arenaria – Phleum arenarium
 Crypsis dura – Urochondra setulosa
 Crypsis juncea – Sporobolus junceus 
 Crypsis macroura – Muhlenbergia macroura
 Crypsis maritima – Sporobolus virginicus
 Crypsis myosurus – Sporobolus spicatus 
 Crypsis phleoides – Muhlenbergia angustata
 Crypsis pygmaea – Rhizocephalus orientalis
 Crypsis setifolia – Muhlenbergia macroura
 Crypsis setulosa – Urochondra setulosa
 Crypsis squarrosa – Munroa squarrosa
 Crypsis stricta – Muhlenbergia angustata
 Crypsis virginica – Sporobolus virginicus

References

External links 
 

Chloridoideae
Poaceae genera